The Czechoslovakia national men's volleyball team was the national volleyball team for Czechoslovakia that had represented the country in international competitions and friendly matches between 1948–1993

FIVB considers Czech Republic (national team) as the inheritor of the records of Czechoslovakia (1948–1993). The Czech team’s first participations in international competitions saw them win a gold medal at the inaugural European Championship in 1948 which kick-started a golden age for the team. They won two more European in 1955 and 1958, two golds at the World Championships of 1956 and 1966, and a further eight medals in other elite tournaments. They took silver at the Tokyo 1964 Olympic Games and followed that with the bronze four years later in Mexico City.

Results

Olympic Games
  1964 —  Silver medal
  1968 —  Bronze medal 
  1972 — 6th place 
  1976 — 5th place 
  1980 — 8th place

World Championship
  1949 Czechoslovakia –  Silver medal 
  1952 Soviet Union –  Silver medal 
  1956 France –  Gold medal 
  1960 Brazil –  Silver medal
  1962 Soviet Union –  Silver medal
  1966 Czechoslovakia –  Gold medal 
  1970 Bulgaria – 4th place 
  1974 Mexico – 5th place
  1978 Italy – 5th place 
  1982 Argentina – 9th place 
  1986 France – 8th place 
  1990 Brazil – 9th place

World Cup
  1965 Poland —  Bronze medal 
  1969 East Germany — 5th place 
  1985 Japan —  Bronze medal

European Championship
  1948 Italy —  Gold medal 
  1950 Bulgaria —  Silver medal
  1955 Romania —  Gold medal
  1958 Czechoslovakia —  Gold medal
  1963 Romania — 5th place 
  1967 Turkey —  Silver medal 
  1971 Italy —  Silver medal 
  1975 Yugoslavia — 6th place 
  1977 Finland — 6th place
  1979 France — 6th place 
  1981 Bulgaria — 4th place 
  1983 East Germany — 5th place 
  1985 Netherlands —  Silver medal 
  1987 Belgium — 6th place 
  1991 Germany — 12th place
  1993 Finland — 8th place

Team

1990 Last World Championship squad

Head coach: Rudolf Matejka, Zdenek Pommer

See also

Czechoslovakia women's national volleyball team

References

External links
Official website
FIVB profile

National men's volleyball teams
Volleyball in Czechoslovakia
Volleyball
World champion national volleyball teams